Vegard Breen (born 8 February 1990) is a Norwegian former professional cyclist, who rode professionally between 2010 and 2017. He was named in the start list for the 2016 Tour de France.

Major results

2008
 1st  Time trial, National Junior Road Championships
 2nd  Time trial, UEC European Road Championships
 2nd Overall Trofeo Karlsberg
 9th Time trial, UCI Juniors World Championships
2012
 1st La Côte Picarde
 4th Overall Tour de Bretagne
2013
 1st  Overall Ronde de l'Oise
1st Points classification
 3rd Overall Tour du Loir-et-Cher
 7th Overall Circuit des Ardennes
1st Stage 3 (TTT)
 8th Overall Tour de Bretagne
2014
 9th Dwars door Drenthe

Grand Tour general classification results timeline

References

External links

1990 births
Living people
People from Nannestad
Norwegian male cyclists
Sportspeople from Viken (county)